Elleria is an extinct genus of xiphosuran of the monotypic family Elleriidae. Only one species is assigned to this genus, Elleria morani.

References
 Størmer, L., Petrunkevitch, A. & Hedgpeth, J.W. 1955. Arthropoda 2 - Chelicerata with sections on Pycnogonida and Palaeoisopus. xvii-181 in Moore, R. C. (ed.). Treatise on Invertebrate Paleontology - Part P - Geological Society of America and University of Kansas Press, Lawrence, 1955

Xiphosura